Girls of Paper and Fire is a 2018 young adult fantasy novel by Natasha Ngan. It is the first book in the Girls of Paper and Fire trilogy. The book was touted by the American Library Association as a love story between two women which is considered to be unique in young adult fantasy.

Plot Summary 
The novel tells the story of eight girls who are chosen as "Paper Girls" and assist the king. What the book describes though is a ninth girl who comes from the poor Paper caste, which is the lowest and most persecuted caste in the city of Ikhara. The girl, Lei, is desired by the king because of her rumored beauty and golden eyes. During her training to become consort to the King, she falls in love with another girl. This forbidden romance and the changes that are occurring within Lei's world leave Lei on a quest for justice and revenge.

References 

LGBT-related young adult novels
2010s LGBT novels
Little, Brown and Company books
2018 LGBT-related literary works